Namling County is a county of Shigatse in the Tibet Autonomous Region.

Geography 
Namling is the current administrative name given to the valleys of Oyuk, Tobgyet, and Shang ... [associated]... with both Buddhism and Bon. Through these valleys respectively flow the 'Nang-gung-chu'mang ra chu Tobpu-chu, and Shang-chu rivers, with their various tributaries, which rise amid the southern slopes of the Nyenchen Tanglha range to the north, and flow southwards to converge with the Brahmaputra [called the Yarlung Tsangpo River in Tibet].
The lower reaches of the Yarlung Tsangpo River make "a sharp U-turn around Namjagbarwa Peak in Pai, Namling County." The county has three geysers.

Town and townships
 Namling Town
 Car Township
 Dagna Township
 Doqoi Township
 Êma Township
 Gyamco Township
 Karzê Township
 Lhabupu Township
 Mangra Township
 Numa Township
 Putang Township
 Dakce Township
 Qum Township
 Ratang Township
 Rindü Township
 Sogqên Township
 Tobgyai Township

Climate

Development efforts 

The Namling County Schools Project was founded by Tashi Tsering in 1991, and has been sponsored by the Boulder-Lhasa Sister City Project (BLSCP) since 1994. As of 2013, it supports 53 rural elementary schools.

As of 2006, 15 out of the county's 17 towns had cell phone service.

As of 2001, potatoes have been introduced in Aimagang (Emagang) as a crop for herdsmen in the county. Potatoes and vegetables were shipped to markets in Xigazê, and production of peas and wheat decreased.

The 2009 HIV/AIDS outreach efforts in rural areas of the county appear to have had a positive impact in comparison to a similar non-intervention area of Tingri County, according to Medicus Mundi Switzerland.

In 2010, protests of environmental damage by gold mining resulted in arrests and at least one fatality.

In 2011, Qin Weiqiang, secretary of the Namling County Party Committee, said that after the "Lhasa–Xigazê Railway is put into operation", the number of tourists in Namling County was expected to increase.

Culture 
"The famous local specialities are silver utensils, Tibetan sword and so on. Namling Town is the office place of Namling with a population 5,000, where are many monasteries."

Traditional Tibetan opera is popular in Namling County, and government funding efforts to preserve the tradition were started in 2005. "Xiangba Tibetan play in Namling County of Tibet has a history of more than 700 years. It is one of the four major schools of the blue-mask Tibetan play, and was born in the late 18th century." Local residents preserve "some traditional Tibetan operas such as "Princess Wencheng", "Chimei Gongdan", "Langsa Wenbo" and so on." "Tongdong Gyaibo (1365-1455), the founder of Tibet Opera, was born in Ngamring County. Legend has it that the iron chain bridge over the Xiongqoi River in Namling County was built with funds collected by Tongdong Gyaibo through performances."

Namling County and the Xiangqu River Basin were a cultural center of the Supi tribe, known as "The Kingdom of Women", and "one of the earliest tribes in Tibet." After "the end of the sixth century, the Supi tribe moved its political center to the Lhasa River Basin."

As of 1999, the county was home to the critically endangered Golden-headed box turtle (Cuora aurocapitata).

Monasteries 
Yungdrungling Monastery "is located at the foot of the Yulha Jiesam mountain in the Numa village in Namling County about 90 km. from Xigazê. The monastery is surrounded by dense wood ... it is one of the four major monasteries of Bon religion in Tibet."

Danag Monastery, over 800 years old, is located in Danag Village.

The remains of the Dingma Monastery, an 11th-century Kadampa monastery, are located on a hill in the Oyuk Valley. It was founded by Ram Dingma Deshek Jungne, a student of Geshe Potowa.
 
The Gongon Lhakhang temple, in Oyuk Township, was said to be built by Songtsen Gampo, and frequented by Padmasambhava and his students Namkhai Nyingpo and King Trisong Detsen in the 8th century.

Oyuk Chigong or Oyuk Jara Gon is a hermitage located at Jarasa in lower Oyuk. It is "the abode or castle of the protector deity Dorje Lekpa: guardian of the Dzogchen teachings."

The Gelukpa monasteries of Drungzhi and Sogchen are located in the Tobgyel Valley.

Notable people 
Mokchokpa Rinchen Tsondrü (1110-1170?) of the Shangpa Kagyu was born in the Lhabu grasslands of the county's Shang Valley. 
Lobsang Yeshe, Fifth Panchen Lama (1663–1737) was born in Namling County.
Tenpai Wangchuk, 8th Panchen Lama (1855–1882) was born in Namling County.
Chadrel Rinpoche (b. 1940) was born in Namling County.
 Guisang Sang (b. appx. 1958), who joined the Tibet Mountaineering Team in 1982, was the first woman in Asia to reach the top of Mount Everest twice.
Tashi Tsering (educator) (1929-2014)

References

External links 
Map of locations in Namling County

Counties of Tibet
Shigatse